Tiger Woods PGA Tour 08 is a sports video game released by EA Sports on all major seventh-generation platforms along with the PlayStation 2, Microsoft Windows and Mac OS X.  EA Tiburon developed every version except the Nintendo DS version, which was worked on by Exient Entertainment.

Reception

Tiger Woods PGA Tour 08 received "mixed or average" and "generally favorable" reviews, according to review aggregator Metacritic.

Games for Windows gave the PC version 7.5 out of 10.

Notes

References

External links
 
 

Official Websites
PS3 Tiger Woods PGA 08 site
Cheats and reviews of all "Tiger Woods" games on the Wii

Additional Golf Courses
Tiger Woods 2008 Custom Courses at CourseDownloads.com

2007 video games
EA Sports games
Golf video games
MacOS games
Nintendo DS games
PlayStation 2 games
PlayStation 3 games
PlayStation Portable games
Sports video games set in the United States
Tiger Woods video games
Video games developed in the United States
Video games set in Canada
Video games set in Ireland
Wii games
Windows games
Xbox 360 games
Exient Entertainment games
Multiplayer and single-player video games